R B Ferguson Club (Young Men's Football Club, Ollur) is the one of the oldest football club in Kerala state and one of the oldest clubs in India. Established on 20 February 1899 in Thrissur, Kerala, it was also the oldest football club in the southern part of India. The club was famed by the nickname Young Men's Football Club and played a huge role in promoting football in Kerala during the early 1900s.

The club was named after the Kochi Police Superintendent, R B Ferguson. The club was established near St. Antony's Forane Church in Ollur, Thrissur City. Later on the club was renamed and run as Young Men's Football Club.

References

Football clubs in Kerala
Football in Thrissur
1899 establishments in British India
Association football clubs established in 1899